Josh Mantellato (born 21 April 1987) is a former Italy international rugby league footballer who most recently played on the  for The Entrance Tigers in the Denton Engineering Cup. He previously played for the Wyong Roos in the Central Coast Division Rugby League competition, Newcastle Knights in the National Rugby League and the Hull Kingston Rovers in the Super League.

Background

Mantellato was born in Gosford, New South Wales, Australia and is of Italian descent.

He played his junior rugby league for the Wyong Roos.

Playing career

Early career
Up until 2011, Mantellato played for the Wyong Roos in the Newcastle Rugby League.

2010
In 2010, Mantellato made his international debut for Italy.

2012
In 2012, Mantellato joined the Newcastle Knights' New South Wales Cup team, finishing the season as the competition's highest point-scorer, with 306 points. On 12 September 2012, he was named on the wing in the 2012 New South Wales Cup Team of the Year. He then signed a 1-year contract with the Knights.

2013
In Round 12 of the 2013 NRL season, Mantellato made his NRL debut for the Knights against the South Sydney Rabbitohs. He scored a try and kicked 3 goals on debut. On 20 August 2013, he re-signed with the Knights on a 1-year contract. On 22 September 2013, he was again named on the wing in the 2013 New South Wales Cup Team of the Year. During 2013, he featured in Italy's successful 2013 Rugby League World Cup qualifying tournament and was selected in the 24-man squad for the World Cup campaign. On 19 October 2013, he kicked the winning field goal in Italy's 15-14 warm up game win over England.

2014
On 21 September 2014, Mantellato was named on the wing in the 2014 New South Wales Cup Team of the Year for the third year in a row.

2015
On 11 August 2014, Mantellato signed a 3-year contract with Super League club, Hull Kingston Rovers, starting in 2015. He made his Super League debut in Round 1 against the Leeds Rhinos. He kicked off his Super League points tally by kicking 5 goals in their 30-40 first round defeat. He scored his first two Super League tries against the Warrington Wolves in Round 3.

2017
In January, Mantellato returned to Australia to play for Sydney Roosters feeder club, Wyong Roos on a 1-year contract following the relegation of Hull Kingston Rovers to the Kingstone Press Championship.

2018
Mantellato spent 2018 playing for Wyong in the Intrust Super Premiership NSW.  At the end of the season it was announced that Wyong would not be competing in the competition in 2019 as the Sydney Roosters ended their agreement for Wyong to be their feeder side instead choosing foundation club North Sydney as the new feeder side.

2021
After exiting the Wyong Roos, Mantellato joined the Entrance Tigers for Season 2021. At the advice of medical professionals, Mantellato would go on to retire after sustaining a throat fracture.

References

External links

Hull Kingston Rovers profile
2017 RLWC profile

1987 births
Living people
Australian people of Italian descent
Australian rugby league players
Hull Kingston Rovers players
Italy national rugby league team players
Newcastle Knights players
Rugby league players from Gosford, New South Wales
Rugby league wingers
Wyong Roos players